Collagonum is a genus of beetles in the family Carabidae, containing the following species:

 Collagonum convexum Baehr, 1995
 Collagonum distortum (Darlington, 1971)
 Collagonum hornabrooki (Darlington, 1971)
 Collagonum laticolle (Baehr, 1992)
 Collagonum limum (Darlington, 1952)
 Collagonum longipenne Baehr, 2001
 Collagonum ophthalmicum (Baehr, 1992)
 Collagonum riedeli Baehr, 1995
 Collagonum robustum Baehr, 1995
 Collagonum thoracicum Baehr, 2001
 Collagonum violaceum Baehr, 1995

References

Platyninae